"The Hollow Men" is the 12th episode of the second season of the American science fiction television series Dollhouse and the show's 25th episode overall. The episode was written by Michele Fazekas, Tara Butters, and Tracy Bellomo, and directed by Terrence O'Hara. It aired in the United States on Fox on January 15, 2010.

This episode immediately follows "Getting Closer". As such the group head to Tucson, where the Rossum Headquarters is, to take down the mainframe.

Plot
The episode starts in a flashback set two years ago. Caroline is in the Rossum office, as Boyd explains to her that he knows she is special because they have tested her blood. He coerces her to join the Dollhouse, under the pretense that if she doesn't comply she will go to prison or be given the death sentence. Boyd assures her he will keep her safe.

In the present, Anthony and Priya arrive back at the Dollhouse. Neither of them can live with themselves for not helping fight this war. However, as they enter the Dollhouse, they see that the war has already begun and move on to investigate.

At an unknown location, Ballard destroys his phone and tells DeWitt they should be safe, at least for now, and that they have to move and cannot wait any longer. However, DeWitt disagrees and they continue to wait for the others to arrive. Ballard checks to see how Mellie is doing after he cut out her tracking device. Mellie attempts to kiss Ballard, but he pulls back as Mellie tries to remember she is just a doll.

A vehicle arrives and it turns out it is Boyd, Topher, and Echo. However Echo is bewildered and incoherent. Boyd manages to sedate her as the group tries to figure out what has happened. Ballard suggests re-evaluating the plan, but Boyd disagrees as they need to take down the mainframe. Ballard says Echo was the only one who could recognise the head of Rossum and in her current state she cannot help. He wonders how they will get inside, but DeWitt says they will simply walk in through the front door as they have something Rossum wants.

Inside the Dollhouse, Anthony and Priya make their way to the security office to try to get the surveillance footage. However all the hard drives have been taken, so they decide to leave. However, as they pass the imprinting chair, Priya notices a note on top of an inserted wedge saying "Press Enter." After a brief debate, Anthony gets into the chair and is imprinted with Topher 2.0 ("The Left Hand"). Priya asks Topher 2.0 what has transpired, but he is as confused as Priya.

The group arrives at Rossum Headquarters and walk straight through the front door as planned. Clyde 2.0 is there to greet them, but he is now in the body of Dr. Saunders/Whiskey. Clyde 2.0 says that this world is for people who can evolve. DeWitt wonders if it includes her and the group.

Back inside the Dollhouse, Topher 2.0 begins to rant about how he would like his body back. Priya is able to calm Topher 2.0 by saying that his original is most likely alive since otherwise there wouldn't be another person to leave the wedge and the note behind. Topher 2.0 wonders why his original left the wedge behind. When Priya mentions the security footage was taken, Topher 2.0 realizes his purpose. He reveals he installed his own camera in the office and plays back the footage, exposing the detail that Boyd had injected Echo with something as she was being imprinted. They realise that Boyd is working for Rossum.

In Clyde 2.0's office, Clyde 2.0 praises DeWitt on how she raised Echo to be what she is today. Clyde 2.0 says that Echo is a savior for a select few and that DeWitt is considered one of them. DeWitt explains that Echo is no use to Rossum given her current condition, but Clyde 2.0 rebuffs by explaining they only want the body.

Locked in a room, Ballard, Mellie, Topher and Boyd try to figure out what is going on. Boyd feigns trying to break the lock, when Topher looks away, he simply uses a key card. Boyd takes Topher with him explaining that they are going after Echo and that Ballard and Mellie would be responsible for taking down the mainframe.

Inside the Dollhouse, Topher 2.0 rants about Boyd's betrayal. Priya attempts to track down Mellie through her tracking device, but it is deactivated. Priya says they need to go and help but Topher 2.0 isn't sure what they can do. Topher 2.0 says he will sacrifice himself and give Anthony back his body, then give him additional abilities, including combat and computer skills.

As Boyd and Topher make their way around Rossum Headquarters, Topher explains that somebody inside the Dollhouse must have betrayed them. He has recognised that Echo's symptoms were similar to when Priya was drugged by Nolan ("Belonging"). Boyd seems concerned, but moves on to take out a guard. Inside the Dollhouse, Anthony's persona has been restored. With his upgrades, he takes out Rossum agents before he and Priya decide to leave for Tucson.

In Rossum Headquarters, Echo finally comes to her senses and realises it is Boyd who has betrayed them. Topher and Boyd continue to walk around before finally stumbling upon a lab. Topher recognises his tech which DeWitt had given up to Mr. Harding. Boyd tries to use one of them, but it is non-functioning. Topher sees that Rossum is weaponizing the tech and attempts to destroy it. However Boyd convinces Topher that if he fixes one unit, they can use it and not have to kill anyone else. Topher agrees and gets to work.

Meanwhile, Ballard and Mellie have made their way to a weapons cache. Mellie tries to understand why Ballard cares about her, given she is only a program. However Ballard says he has become one as well and that it doesn't matter to him anymore. Topher realizes he can fix the tech with a simple fix. No sooner has he explained it to Boyd when Boyd reveals his duplicity. Suddenly, Echo jumps in and beats Boyd to the floor. However, she is stopped by Clyde 2.0 after he threatens to kill DeWitt. Topher cannot believe what is going on. Boyd explains that he cares about the group and that is why he brought them here. It is not revealed whether he was actually going to kill Topher or not. Mellie and Ballard arrive at the cooling unit for the mainframe. They decide to destroy the cooling unit, overheating and destroying the servers.

Boyd notes the conviction that Topher and DeWitt have. He had wanted them all with him as his "family", except Ballard, whom he dislikes. DeWitt says she would rather be dead than keep Boyd's company. Boyd observes that death would be a blessing, as once Rossum executes their plan it will be likely they will be imprinted and enslaved. He explains that the technology is out there and it cannot be un-invented, and that Echo is their saviour because whenever she blocks an imprint, it leaves chemical markers in her spinal fluid. They are going to farm it and use it on themselves so they can become immune to imprinting. Boyd then knocks Echo out with a disruptor.

Mellie and Ballard are able to destroy the cooling system, but the alarms go off. Boyd threatens to kill DeWitt if she doesn't activate Mellie's sleeper protocol ("Man on the Street"). When DeWitt calls the bluff, Boyd uses a recording of her activation code and Mellie almost kills Ballard. When Mellie regains control for a short time, she kills herself instead.

Echo has been strapped down and is being prepared to have her spinal fluid tapped. Boyd attempts to use the neural lock and key but Echo rebuffs him. Anthony and Priya arrive and manage to free Echo. Echo orders Anthony and Priya to rescue DeWitt and Topher while she finishes Caroline's job: shutting down the Rossum labs.

Priya surrenders herself as a distraction, allowing Anthony to take out the guards and free Topher and DeWitt. Topher says he needs to destroy the tech and the plans, as well as the manufacturing equipment. As Echo tries to look for a way to destroy the labs, she runs into Clyde 2.0. Echo tries to get through to Whiskey or Claire, but she fails and they engage in a brutal fight.

Ballard runs into Boyd, and having been separated from the group, does not know what is going on. Boyd tells Ballard that DeWitt turned on them. Echo has just knocked out Clyde 2.0 when Boyd and Ballard arrive. Boyd turns his weapon on Ballard and holds him hostage. Echo is unable to shoot because she fears hitting Ballard. However, she shoots Ballard in the leg to give herself a free shot at Boyd. The plan fails as Boyd rushes down onto Echo and they engage in a fist fight. Boyd gets the better of Echo and is about to kill her, until Topher arrives, uses the remote wipe/imprinting tech on Boyd and turns him into a doll.

Echo straps Boyd with explosives and hands him a grenade. She orders him to walk into the mainframe and pull the pin when she leaves the room. Topher is able to get Claire/Clyde 2.0 out while Ballard evacuates the building before leaving himself. Adelle, Topher, Ballard, Anthony, and Priya wait outside when the explosion destroys the labs. Echo makes it out just in time. "So, did we save the world?" asks Ballard. "I guess we did," Echo responds.

Ten years later, Echo and Ballard are fighting through the streets of an apocalyptic Los Angeles. Despite their best efforts to stop Rossum, the corporation was ultimately successful in deploying the mind-wiping tech.

Reception

Reviews
Jevon Phillips from Los Angeles Times said "viewers were probably a bit more on edge knowing that Boyd Langton was the puppet master and having to watch him guide the team around." Rachel Reitsleff from iF Magazine said the episode had "lots of action, lots of emotion, and lots of exposition in an eventful episode." She did praise the performances of Lennix and Acker in their roles as Boyd and Clyde respectively, citing "Lennix is menacing and weirdly sweet as Boyd shows his emotions even while threatening his erstwhile friends, and Acker plays the self-confident Clyde with relish in a bit of plotting that makes great use of the actress." She also notes the speed of the episode saying "due to the series’ cancellation, storylines that seem as though they could have sustained a whole season are resolved in an episode, which requires what feel like long monologues from a number of characters." Eric Goldman of IGN gave the episode a 6.3. He noted that though the previous episodes had given the show much momentum, and in regards to the show's rushed deadline, "it's still difficult to not find this episode lacking." Goldman also commented on the inconstancy and the infallibility of Boyd's betrayal, stating how "it just didn't add up."

This episode was praised in particular for its acting, notably from Harry Lennix (Boyd), and Enver Gjokaj (Anthony), commenting particularly that "Enver Gjokaj is a wonderful actor and did an amazing job mimicking Fran Kranz."

References

External links
 

2010 American television episodes
Dollhouse (TV series) episodes